The mayor of Naples is an elected politician who, along with the Naples’s City Council of 40 members, is accountable for the strategic government of Naples.

The following is a list of Mayors of Naples, Italy.

List

Kingdom of the Two Sicilies (1813–1861)

Notes

Kingdom of Italy (1861–1946)

Italian Republic (1946–present)
From 1943 to 1993, the Mayor of Naples was elected by the City Council. 

Notes

Direct election (since 1993)
Since 1993, under provisions of new local administration law, the Mayor of Naples is chosen by direct election, originally every four, and since 2001 every five years.

Notes

Timeline

By time in office

Elections

Mayoral and City Council election, 1993
The election took place on two rounds: the first on 21 November, the second on 5 December 1993.

Mayoral and City Council election, 1997
The election took place on 16 November 1997.

Mayoral and City Council election, 2001
The election took place in two rounds: the first on 13 May, the second on 27 May 2001.

Mayoral and City Council election, 2006
The election took place on 28–29 May 2006.

Mayoral and City Council election, 2011
The election took place in two rounds: the first on 15–16 May, the second on 29–30 May 2011.

|- style="background-color:#E9E9E9;text-align:center;"
! colspan="4" rowspan="1" style="text-align:left;" | Parties and coalitions
! colspan="1" | Votes
! colspan="1" | %
! colspan="1" | Seats
|-
| style="background-color:lightblue" rowspan="5" |
| style="background-color:" |
| style="text-align:left;" | The People of Freedom (Il Popolo delle Libertà)
| PdL
| 97,752 || 23.85% || 8
|-
| style="background-color:orange" |
| style="text-align:left;" | Force of the South (Forza del Sud)
| FdS
| 21,428 || 5.23% || 1
|-
| style="background-color:#1560BD" |
| style="text-align:left;" | We the South (Noi Sud)
| NS
| 14,658 || 3.58% || 1
|-
| style="background-color:#2E5894" |
| style="text-align:left;" | Lettieri List (Lista Lettieri)
| LL
| 12,571 || 3.07% || 1
|-
| style="background-color:" |
| style="text-align:left;" | Others 
| 
| 30,490 || 7.43% || 0
|- style="background-color:lightblue"
| colspan="4" style="text-align:left;" | Lettieri coalition (Centre-right)
| 176,901 || 43.16% || 11
|-
| style="background-color:pink" rowspan="3" |
| style="background-color:" |
| style="text-align:left;" | Democratic Party (Partito Democratico)
| PD
| 68,018 || 16.59% || 5
|-
| style="background-color:" |
| style="text-align:left;" | Left Ecology Freedom (Sinistra Ecologia Libertà)
| SEL
| 16,283 || 3.97% || 0
|-
| style="background-color:" |
| style="text-align:left;" | Others 
| 
| 8,682 || 2.12% || 0
|- style="background-color:pink"
| style="text-align:left;" colspan="4" | Morcone coalition (Centre-left)
| 92,983 || 22.68% || 5
|-
| style="background-color:orange" rowspan="4" |
| style="background-color:orange" |
| style="text-align:left;" | Italy of Values (Italia dei Valori)
| IdV
| 33,320 || 8.13% || 15
|-
| style="background-color:#CD7F32" |
| style="text-align:left;" | Naples is Yours (Napoli è Tua)
| NT
| 18,902 || 4.61% || 8
|-
| style="background-color:" |
| style="text-align:left;" | Federation of the Left (Federazione della Sinistra)
| FdS
| 15,008 || 3.66% || 6
|-
| style="background-color:" |
| style="text-align:left;" | Others 
| 
| 1,292 || 0.32% || 0
|- style="background-color:orange"
| colspan="4" style="text-align:left;" | De Magistris coalition (Left-wing)
| 68,522 || 16.72% ||  29
|-
| style="background-color:skyblue" rowspan="4" |
| style="background-color:" |
| style="text-align:left;" | Union of the Centre (Unione di Centro)
| UDC
| 21,335 || 5.21% || 2
|-
| style="background-color:" |
| style="text-align:left;" | Future and Freedom (Futuro e Libertà)
| FLI
| 13,807 || 3.37% || 1
|-
| style="background-color:" |
| style="text-align:left;" | Alliance for Italy (Alleanza per l'Italia)
| ApI
| 6,003 || 1.46% || 0
|-
| style="background-color:" |
| style="text-align:left;" | Others 
| 
| 5,904 || 1.44% || 0
|- style="background-color:skyblue"
| style="text-align:left;" colspan="4" | Pasquino coalition (Centre)
| 47,069 || 11.48% || 3
|-
| style="background-color:" |
| style="text-align:left;" colspan="2" | Others 
| 
| 24,420 || 5.96% || 0
|-
| colspan="7" style="background-color:#E9E9E9" | 
|- style="font-weight:bold;"
| style="text-align:left;" colspan="4" | Total
| 409,895 || 100% || 48
|-
| colspan="7" style="background-color:#E9E9E9" | 
|-
| style="text-align:left;" colspan="4" | Votes cast / turnout 
| 490,142 || 60.33% || style="background-color:#E9E9E9;" |
|-
| style="text-align:left;" colspan="4" | Registered voters
| 812,450 ||  || style="background-color:#E9E9E9;" |
|-
| colspan="7" style="background-color:#E9E9E9" | 
|-
| style="text-align:left;" colspan="7" | Source: Ministry of the Interior
|}

Mayoral and City Council election, 2016
The election took place in two rounds: the first on 5 June and the second on 19 June 2016.

|- style="background-color:#E9E9E9;text-align:center;"
! colspan="4" rowspan="1" style="text-align:left;" | Parties and coalitions
! colspan="1" | Votes
! colspan="1" | %
! colspan="1" | Seats
|-
| style="background-color:orange" rowspan="5" |
| style="background-color:orange" |
| style="text-align:left;" | De Magistris List (Lista De Magistris)
| LDM
| 51,896 || 13.79% || 10
|-
| style="background-color:#E4590F" |
| style="text-align:left;" | Democracy and Autonomy (Democrazia e Autonomia)
| DemA
| 28,587 || 7.60% || 5
|-
| style="background-color:" |
| style="text-align:left;" | Naples in Common to the Left (Napoli in Comune a Sinistra)
| NCS
| 19,945 || 5.30% || 4
|-
| style="background-color:" |
| style="text-align:left;" | Federation of the Greens (Federazione dei Verdi)
| FdV
| 11,341 || 3.01% || 2
|-
| style="background-color:" |
| style="text-align:left;" | Others 
| 
| 37,971 || 10.08% || 3
|- style="background-color:orange"
| colspan="4" style="text-align:left;" | De Magistris coalition (Left-wing)
| 149,740 || 39.80% || 24
|-
| style="background-color:lightblue" rowspan="3" |
| style="background-color:" |
| style="text-align:left;" | Forza Italia 
| FI
| 36,145 || 9.61% || 4
|-
| style="background-color:#2E5894" |
| style="text-align:left;" | Lettieri List (Lista Lettieri)
| LL
| 28,869 || 7.67% || 2
|-
| style="background-color:" |
| style="text-align:left;" | Others 
| 
| 27,347 || 7.27% || 1
|- style="background-color:lightblue"
| colspan="4" style="text-align:left;" | Lettieri coalition (Centre-right)
| 92,361 || 24.55% || 7
|-
| style="background-color:pink" rowspan="3" |
| style="background-color:" |
| style="text-align:left;" | Democratic Party (Partito Democratico)
| PD
| 43,790 || 11.64% || 6
|-
| style="background-color:" |
| style="text-align:left;" | Popular Area (Area Popolare)
| AP
| 7,521 || 2.00% || 1
|-
| style="background-color:" |
| style="text-align:left;" | Others 
| 
| 37,675 || 10.01% || 0
|- style="background-color:pink"
| style="text-align:left;" colspan="4" | Valente coalition (Centre-left)
| 88,986 || 23.65% || 7
|-
| style="background-color:" |
| style="text-align:left;" colspan="2" | Five Star Movement (Movimento Cinque Stelle) 
| M5S
| 36,359 || 9.66% || 2
|-
| style="background-color:" |
| style="text-align:left;" colspan="2" | Others 
| 
| 8,817 || 2.35% || 0
|-
| colspan="7" style="background-color:#E9E9E9" | 
|- style="font-weight:bold;"
| style="text-align:left;" colspan="4" | Total
| 376,263 || 100% || 40
|-
| colspan="7" style="background-color:#E9E9E9" | 
|-
| style="text-align:left;" colspan="4" | Votes cast / turnout 
| 426,602 || 54.12% || style="background-color:#E9E9E9;" |
|-
| style="text-align:left;" colspan="4" | Registered voters
| 788,291 ||  || style="background-color:#E9E9E9;" |
|-
| colspan="7" style="background-color:#E9E9E9" | 
|-
| style="text-align:left;" colspan="7" | Source: Ministry of the Interior
|}

Mayoral and City Council election, 2021
The election took place on 3–4 October 2021.

See also
 Timeline of Naples

References

Naples
 List
Naples-related lists